Chandaal is a 1998 Hindi-language Indian action drama film directed by T. L. V. Prasad, starring Mithun Chakraborty, Sneha, Avtar Gill, Puneet Issar and Hemant Birje. Sunny Deol was offered the lead role but he declined due to other work. Mithun Chakraborty took the lead instead. In British Columbia, Canada this film didn't have a theatrical release.

Plot
Indrajeet is an honest police officer happily living with his family. His sister loves one young fellow; subsequently, it is revealed that he was the brother of local don Durjan Rai Sahab Singh. When Indrajeet arrests Durjan Singh with his gangs, he took revenge and kills all the family members of Indrajeet and fabricated a false murder case against him. He was sent into prison for committing the death of his parents and sister. After releasing from jail, he worked in a burning ghat. In these courses, he met with a young brave lady journalist who was chased by the gang of don. Indrajeet saved her and fall in love with the journalist. With her help, he started killing Durjan Singh's gang for taking revenge. Indrajeet's subordinate police officer Khurana, was honest but could not find any evidence against him.

Cast
 Mithun Chakraborty as Police inspector Indrajeet a.k.a. Chandaal
 Sneha as Sneha
 Rami Reddy as Durjan Rai Sahab Singh
 Puneet Issar as Police inspector Khurana
 Hemant Birje as Hemant 
 Jack Gaud as Jack 
 Avtar Gill as Indrajeet's father
 Asrani as Chandaal
 Altaf Raja as a Singer
 Emisha Nagi as Sneha's friend
 Kasam Ali as son of Rai Sahab
 Ashwin Kaushal as Ashwin son of Rai Sahab
 Lekha Govil as Indrajeet's mother
 Pinky Chenoy as Indrajeet's sister
 Dustin Tiffany as Raju

Music
The music was given by Anand–Milind

References

External links
 

1998 films
1990s Hindi-language films
Indian action drama films
Mithun's Dream Factory films
Films shot in Ooty
Indian films about revenge
Films scored by Anand–Milind
Indian martial arts films
1998 martial arts films
Films directed by T. L. V. Prasad
1990s action drama films